Morön BK is a Swedish football club located in Skellefteå in Västerbotten County.

Background
Morön Bollklubb was formed at a meeting held in 1935, the driving force being Elof Burman who became the club chairman.  After a lot of hard work by club members who prepared the Skogsvallen stadium, the club purchased the venue in 1942 for 4000 kr.  Skogsvallen was  completed in 1945 and the inaugural match was against Sunnanå SK with the home side winning 2–1.

Since their foundation Morön BK has participated mainly in the middle divisions of the Swedish football league system.  The club currently (2015) plays in Division 3 Northern Norrland which is the fifth tier of Swedish football.  The club play their home matches at the Skogsvallen IP in Skellefteå.

Morön BK are affiliated to the Västerbottens Fotbollförbund.

Season to season

Footnotes

External links
 Morön BK – Official website

Football clubs in Västerbotten County
Association football clubs established in 1935
1935 establishments in Sweden